The Miskito Admiral was an official in the Miskito Kingdom.  His domain was the southernmost of the kingdom's territories, extending from Peal Key Lagoon down to Bluefields.  The title emerged later than other Miskito titles.

List of Admirals
 Dilly (c. 1740)
 Trelawney "Alparis" Dilson (c 1760-1770)
 "The King's Brother" (c. 1800)
 Earnee (c. 1816)

References

Miskito